Driver Not Included is the debut studio album by American rock band Orange 9mm. It was released on February 14, 1995 through EastWest Records. Considered as a landmark release in 1990's New York hardcore scene, the album incorporates influences from funk and heavy metal.

Critical reception

AllMusic critic Jason Anderson described the album as "a very strong effort," further stating: "This 1995 Elektra release deserves its own place among the list of important '90s aggro/punk/hardcore releases."

Track listing
All tracks are written by Orange 9mm except where noted.
 "Glistening" - 2:32	
 "High Speed Changer" - 2:53	
 "Disclaimer" - 2:34	
 "Suspect" - 3:57	
 "Pissed" - 3:04	
 "Toilet" - 2:19	
 "Magnet" - 3:09	
 "Guyatone" - 3:35	
 "Thickest Glass" - 3:02	
 "Can't Decide" - 3:15	
 "Sacrifice" - 4:27	
 "Cutting and Draining" - 3:27

Personnel
Adapted from AllMusic.

 Mike Bloom – photography
 Bryan Carlstrom – engineer
 Annette Cisneros – assistant engineer
 Matthew Cross – drums
 Matthew Curry – assistant engineer
 Nick DiDia – mixing
 Jim Evans – art direction
 Don Fury – mixing
 Dave Jerden – mixing, producer
 Chaka Malik – vocals
 George Marino – mastering
 Tim Owen – photography
 Chris Traynor – guitar
Davide Gentile - bass

Charts

References

External links
 

1995 debut albums
Orange 9mm albums
Albums produced by Dave Jerden
Elektra Records albums